During the 1995–96 English football season, Charlton Athletic F.C. competed in the Football League First Division.

Season summary
In the summer of 1995, new chairman Richard Murray appointed Alan Curbishley as sole manager of Charlton. Under his sole leadership Charlton made an appearance in the playoffs in 1996 but were eliminated by Crystal Palace in the semi-finals.

Defender, Richard Rufus was placed in the PFA Team of the Year.

Final league table

Results
Charlton Athletic's score comes first

Legend

Football League First Division

First Division play-offs

FA Cup

League Cup

Players

First-team squad
Squad at end of season

References

Notes

Charlton Athletic F.C. seasons
Charlton Athletic